Perry Township is one of six townships in Martin County, Indiana, United States. As of the 2010 census, its population was 5,093 and it contained 2,255 housing units.

Geography

Cities, towns, villages
 Crane
 Loogootee

Unincorporated towns
 Bramble at 
 Burns City at 
 Mount Pleasant at 
 Scenic Hill at 
 Whitfield at 
(This list is based on USGS data and may include former settlements.)

Cemeteries
The township contains these seventeen cemeteries: Blankenship, Boggs Creek, Brook, Carr, Goodwill, Henry, Holt, Houghton, Ledgerwood, Love, Saint Johns, Saint Joseph, Salem, Waggoner, West Union, Williams and Woods.

Major highways
  U.S. Route 50
  U.S. Route 231
  State Road 550

Lakes
 West Boggs Lake

Landmarks
 West Boggs Park

School districts
 Loogootee Community School Corporation

Political districts
 Indiana's 8th congressional district
 State House District 63
 State Senate District 48

References

Sources
 
 United States Census Bureau 2008 TIGER/Line Shapefiles
 IndianaMap

External links
 Indiana Township Association
 United Township Association of Indiana
 City-Data.com page for Perry Township

Townships in Martin County, Indiana
Townships in Indiana